The 2009 Aberto de São Paulo was a professional tennis tournament played on outdoor hard courts. It was part of the 2009 ATP Challenger Tour. It took place in São Paulo, Brasil between 5 and 11 January 2009.

Singles main-draw entrants

Seeds

 Rankings are as of December 28, 2008.

Other entrants
The following players received wildcards into the singles main draw:
  Eric Gomes
  Nicolás Santos
  Flávio Saretta
  Daniel Silva

The following players received entry from the qualifying draw:
  Rafael Camilo
  Harel Levy
  Frédéric Niemeyer
  Izak van der Merwe

Champions

Men's singles

 Ricardo Mello def.  Paul Capdeville, 6–2, 6–4

Men's doubles

 Carlos Berlocq /  Leonardo Mayer  def.  Mariano Hood /  Horacio Zeballos, 7–6(1), 6–3

External links

Prime Cup Aberto de Sao Paulo
Prime Cup Aberto de Sao Paulo
Prime Cup Aberto de São Paulo
Aberto de São Paulo